Columbus Communications was a cable television, telephone, and Broadband speed Internet service provider.  Operating as a regional media company, Columbus is currently financially based in Barbados and provides services in Grenada, Jamaica, Trinidad and Tobago, Curaçao, Antigua and Barbuda, Saint Lucia, and Saint Vincent and the Grenadines.

The company's operations in Antigua and Barbuda were previously branded as Karib Cable. But it as well as its operations in other countries are now under the Flow branding. The company formerly held a 71% share in Cable Bahamas, before divesting of that holding in 2010.

History
Columbus entered the Curaçao retail market in January 2010 through the acquisition of Curaçao Cable TV NV, a fledgling start up that held video and internet concessions, but had yet to reach the commercial stage.

By the fall of 2010, a new fully digital video head end was constructed, providing Flow customers access to more than 250 video and audio channels by far the most comprehensive television service in Curaçao. In addition, Flow offers residential broadband internet packages ranging from an entry-level service of 5 Mbit/s up to 100 Mbit/s. In partnership with its sister company, Columbus Business Solutions, they also provide a range of corporate data services including data storage, disaster recovery, IP services, hosting and business continuity services.

The company was then officially acquired by Cable & Wireless Communications, the parent company of another fellow telecommunications company in the Caribbean, named LIME. The cost of the acquisition was USD $1.85 Billion dollars.

The company has now become a fully owned entity of CWC. FLOW has now become the consumer-facing brand for the new company across all of CWC's former LIME. It offers quad-play services (i.e. mobile, fixed voice, fixed home broadband and television).

Management & Executive Team
Chairman and Chief Executive Officer, Brendan Paddick
President and COO, Paul W. Scott
Chief Financial Officer, Maxwell Parsons, C.A.

See also
ARCOS-1
CFX (cable system)
Fibralink (cable system)

References

External links
 
Columbus Networks
COLUMBUS COMMUNICATIONS EXPANDS OPERATIONS TO GRENADA - (14 April 2008)
Columbus to run fibre-optic cable from Colombia to Jamaica - Jamaica Observer (25, May 2007)
Flow gets nod on all-island(Jamaica) cable licence - Jamaica Observer  (01, April 2007)
Alcatel and Columbus Communications inaugurate FibraLink submarine network in Jamaica - Press Release (5 April 2006)
Columbus sets sail in T&T - Trinidad and Tobago Guardian Newspaper (16 February 2006)
Alcatel to deploy a new submarine optical cable network to serve Jamaica - Press Release (7 June 2005)
New World Network Completes Sale to Columbus Communications - Press Release (12 September 2005)
Columbus Communications acquires New World Network - (15 September 2005)
John Risley And Michael Lee-Chin — The Cable Guys - Canadian Business Online (5 December 2005)
Columbus Communications Flow target of piracy by HBO Latin America - ttgapers.com (11 May 2007)

Cable television companies
Companies of Jamaica
Mass media companies of Trinidad and Tobago
Companies of Barbados